Charles Woods may refer to:
Charles Woods (Alabama), Alabama businessman, broadcaster and aspiring politician
Charles Albert Woods (1852–1925), U.S. federal judge
Charles R. Woods (1827–1885), United States Army officer and Union general during the American Civil War
Charles Woods (filmmaker), Australian film director of the silent era
Charles Woods (cricketer, born 1878) (1878–1940), English cricketer
Charles Woods (Surrey cricketer) (1810–1885), English cricketer

See also
Charles Wood (disambiguation)